Vernon Alexander "Lefty" Hughes (April 15, 1893 – September 26, 1961) was a Major League Baseball pitcher who played for the Baltimore Terrapins of the Federal League in .

External links

1893 births
1961 deaths
People from Etna, Pennsylvania
Baltimore Terrapins players
Major League Baseball pitchers
Baseball players from Pennsylvania